Trichopeza longicornis is a Palearctic species of Empididae.

References

Asilomorph flies of Europe
Insects described in 1822
Empididae